Lac de Gras is a lake approximately  north east of Yellowknife, in the Northwest Territories of Canada. Lac de Gras was the centre of the  diamond rush of the 1990s. There are two working, and one closed, diamond mines in the area, Diavik Diamond Mine, Ekati Diamond Mine, and the care and maintenance  Snap Lake Diamond Mine. It was called Ekati by aboriginal peoples.

The lake is ultraoligotrophic but supports a slow-growing but stable population of some eight species of cold-water fishes, including round whitefish, cisco, and lake trout.  Lake trout dominate the lake, both numerically and in terms of biomass.
Other native fish species include common whitefish, Arctic grayling, burbot, longnose sucker, and slimy sculpin.

Diavik Diamond Mines is conducting open-pit mining of kimberlite pipes using explosives near the lake.

The median flood peak discharge in the Narrows is  making it an important corridor for fish movements.

See also
List of lakes in the Northwest Territories

References

De Gras